Johnny Carroll (1937–1995) was an American rockabilly musician.

Johnny Carroll may also refer to:
Johnny Carroll (trumpeter), Irish musician
Johnny Carroll (association footballer) (1924–2001), Irish association footballer
Johnny Carroll (Gaelic footballer) (born 1941), Irish Gaelic footballer

See also
John Carroll (disambiguation)
Jonathan Carroll (disambiguation)